Live at The Triple Door  is the third album by Skerik's Syncopated Taint Septet released 2010. It was recorded live at the venue The Triple Door in Seattle September 2003. Two tracks feature vocalist Om Johari (of Hell's Belles). Several tracks include string arrangements.

The Syncopated Taint performed the first night for the new opening of The Triple Door in Seattle in September 2003. They performed in white tie formal.

Track listing
"Summer Pudding" (9:04) by Hans Teuber
"The Third Rail" (6:50) by Steve Moore
"Taming the Shrew" (9:12) by Steve Moore
"Mississippi Goddamn" (4:13) by Nina Simone
"The Mystery of Man" (4:29) by Francy Roland and Eugene Lees
"To More O's" (7:39) by Dave Carter
"Marriage of Days" (2:25) by Eyvind Kang

Personnel
Skerik - tenor saxophone
Craig Flory - baritone saxophone, clarinet
Hans Teuber - alto saxophone, flute
Dave Carter - trumpet
Steve Moore - trombone, electric piano, bells
Joe Doria - Hammond Organ
John Wicks - Drums

Guest musicians
Om Johari - vocals ("Mississippi Goddamn", "The Mystery of Man")
Jen Kozel - violin
Stephen Creswell - viola
Gretchen Yanover - cello
Eyvind Kang - additional viola, violin and string coach

References 

Skerik's Syncopated Taint Septet albums
2010 live albums
Live jazz fusion albums
Covers albums